Bagdarin is a rural locality (a selo) and the administrative center of Bauntovsky Evenkiysky District of the Republic of Buryatia, Russia, located on the Vitim Plateau. Population:

Geography 
The village is located in the Vitim Plateau. Above the northern side of the village rises the "White Mountain", a barren hill composed of dolomite rock.

Transportation

Bagdarin is served by the Bagdarin Airport.

Climate
Bagdarin has a subarctic climate (Köppen climate classification Dwc) with severely cold winters and mild summers. Precipitation is quite low, but is much higher in summer than at other times of the year.

References

Rural localities in Bauntovsky District